"Muir" is the Scots word for "moorland", and the Irish and Scots Gaelic for "sea", and is the etymological origin of the surname and Clan Muir/Mure/Moore in Scotland and other parts of the world.

Places

United States
 Muir, Willits, California, a former unincorporated community now incorporated in Willits
 Muir, Michigan, a village
 Muir, Pennsylvania, a census-designated place
 Camp Muir, a high altitude refuge on Mount Rainier, Washington
 Mount Muir in the Sierra Nevada, California
 Muir Pass in the Sierra Nevada
 Muir Glacier, Alaska
 Muir Grove, a giant sequoia grove in Sequoia National Park, California
 Muir site, an archaeological site in Jessamine County, Kentucky

Elsewhere
 Muir Peak, Antarctica
 Lake Muir, Western Australia
 Mount Muir (Canadian Rockies), Canada
 Muir, a community in the township of Norwich, Ontario, Canada
 Muir Seamount, an underwater volcano in the Atlantic Ocean north of Bermuda

Schools
 Muir College (disambiguation)
 Muir Middle School (disambiguation)
 Muir Elementary School (disambiguation)

People and fictional characters
 Muir (surname), a list of people and fictional characters
 Muir (given name)
 Clan Muir, a Scottish clan

Other uses
 Muir baronets, a title in the Baronetage of the United Kingdom
 , a World War II destroyer escort
 Muir Army Airfield, a military airfield near Annville, Pennsylvania
 Muir House (disambiguation), various buildings on the US National Register of Historic Places
 Muir Homes, a privately owned housebuilding company in Scotland
 Muir Island, a fictional island in the Marvel Comics universe

See also
 Muirs Highway, Western Australia